Abu Twalib Kasenally MP (born أبو طالب كاسينالي on 10 August 1941) is a Mauritian physician and politician. He is more commonly known as "Abu Kasenally".

Political career
He practised surgery since 1974 and became Regional Health Director and Principal Medical Officer (PMO) at the Ministry of Health. In 2000 he resigned from the Civil Service to join politics. At the 11 September 2000 National Assembly Elections he was candidate of Labour-PMXD coalition in Constituency No.3 Port Louis Maritime and Port Louis East but failed to be elected with only 5744 votes. 

At the 03 July 2005 elections he was elected in Constituency No.15 (La Caverne-Phoenix) after campaigning for Alliance Social (PTR-PMXD-VF-MR-MMSM).He was appointed Minister of Public Utilities in 2005 before being appointed as Minister of Housing in 2008.   

At the 05 May 2010 elections Abu Kasenally was elected in Constituency No.13 (Rivière des Anguilles-Souillac) as candidate for the PTR-PMSD-MSM coalition. Abu Kasenally was Minister of Housing & Lands until the December 2014 elections. He did not participate in the 2014 elections and 2019 elections.

References

1941 births
Living people
Labour Party (Mauritius) politicians
Government ministers of Mauritius
Housing ministers of Mauritius
Mauritian Muslims
Mauritian politicians of Indian descent